{
  "type": "FeatureCollection",
  "features": [
    {
      "type": "Feature",
      "properties": {},
      "geometry": {
        "type": "Point",
        "coordinates": [
          -87.96890258789064,
          43.30160224727497
        ]
      }
    }
  ]
}The Cedarburg Wire and Nail Factory is a former sawmill, grist mill, factory, and hydroelectric plant on Cedar Creek located in the Town of Cedarburg Wisconsin in the United States. The stone mill was built in 1871 at a cost of $21,000 and was originally known as the Excelsior Mill.

While operating under the Excelsior name the mill produced both flour and lumber. The mill used the hydropower of the Columbia Mill just upstream by way of a flume. In 1885 a large fire consumed all the wooden buildings and gutted the stone main mill building causing the mill to shut down. In 1890 it was bought by John Weber, who also owned the Columbia Mill just upstream. The same year the Cedarburg Wire and Nail Company was formed and the mill was retooled to make drawn steel products. At some point between the mills completion and 1910 the mill received its own dam and hydropower, the dam was reconstructed in 1930, and a hydroelectric generation scheme was installed consisting of a vertical Francis turbine and a 125 kW generator to provide power to the factory. The wire and nail factory and hydroelectric scheme continued to operate until the 1960s.

From the 1960s through the 1970s a sewer carried waste oil including PCBs from Mercury Marines Cedarburg factory to the Ruck Pond above the Wire and Nail Pond. The contamination was also carried downstream to the Wire and Nail Pond where it settled into the sediment of the millpond. In the 1990s the hydro electric plant was reactivated but was shut down a few years after due to reliability issues. In 2017 the PCB contaminated sediment was dredged from the pond in a large effort to clean up Cedar Creek.

See also

References 

Buildings and structures in Ozaukee County, Wisconsin
Limestone buildings in the United States
Grinding mills in Wisconsin
Industrial buildings completed in 1871
Hydroelectric power plants in Wisconsin
Sawmills in the United States
1871 establishments in Wisconsin